Simon Norton may refer to:
Simon Norton (MP) (1578–1641), English politician
Simon P. Norton (1952–2019), English mathematician

See also
Norton Simon